The double-barred finch (Stizoptera bichenovii) is an estrildid finch found in dry savannah, tropical (lowland) dry grassland and shrubland habitats in northern and eastern Australia. It is sometimes referred to as Bicheno's finch or as the owl finch, the latter of which owing to the dark ring of feathers around the face.

Taxonomy 
Nicholas Aylward Vigors and Thomas Horsfield described the double-barred finch in 1827. The specific epithet commemorates James Ebenezer Bicheno, a colonial secretary of Van Diemen's Land appointed in September 1842.
There are two subspecies:

 Stizoptera bichenovii bichenovii of eastern Australia
 Stizoptera bichenovii annulosa of northern and northwestern Australia, described by John Gould in 1840.

The origin and phylogeny of Estrildinae was studied by Antonio Arnaiz-Villena and colleagues who suggested that the subfamily may have originated in India and dispersed thereafter (towards Africa and Pacific Ocean habitats).

Description
The double-barred finch is a 10–11 cm long munia-like bird. It has a white face bordered with black, brown upperparts and throat, and white underparts. The throat and underparts are separated by another black line. The wings are patterned in brown and white. The sexes are similar, but juveniles are duller and browner. A less common subspecies with brown or black underparts is known to exist.

Behaviour 
The double-barred finch is granivorous and highly gregarious. Nests are built in grass, bushes or low trees, with four to six eggs laid per clutch. The call is a soft tet or a louder peew, and the song is a soft fluting, which is somewhat like the zebra finch.

Gallery

References 

 Finches and Sparrows by Clement, Harris and Davis,

External links 

 Video of double-barred finches

double-barred finch
Endemic birds of Australia
double-barred finch
Taxa named by Thomas Horsfield
Taxa named by Nicholas Aylward Vigors
Articles containing video clips
Taxobox binomials not recognized by IUCN